Balzano is an Italian surname which translates to "strange" or "odd". Notable people with the surname include:

Antonio Balzano (born 1986), Italian footballer 
Flora Balzano (born 1951), Canadian writer and comedian

References

Italian-language surnames